The Elabored (sometimes spelt Elabered) Sub-Zone is home to the Elabered Estate, a large state owned farm producing amongst other things citrus fruits and tomatoes.  The farm is irrigated during Eritrea's long dry season by large reservoirs which also supply water to the Sub-Zone's main town of Eden.

To the north of the Eden, some seventeen kilometers away, is one of Anseba's most important religious sites; the monastery of Debre Sina. Many thousands of Eritrean Orthodox pilgrims visit the monastery for its celebration of the Virgin Mary which usually takes place at the start of the long rains.

Eden has a population of approximately 9000 people.  It has a regional health centre, Telecommunication center and is home to a masjid and a newly built Catholic church, Holy Redeemer Parish. The town of Eden is very central to the Elabered District. The sub-districts of She'eb Seleba, Debre Sina (mount Sinai), Hadish-Adi Anseba and others flow to Eden for their transportation, means of communication and administrative reasons. Its tropical climate and geographic position, surrounded by high mountains, gives its beauty and warm climate. Eden has the largest Agricultural plantation in the region. And it is home for tropical and sub tropical plantation. Eden is well known of its various fruits especially oranges, mandarines, grape fruits, grapes, lemons, bananas, green peppers, etc.

See also
 List of massacres committed during the Eritrean War of Independence

Anseba Region
Populated places in Eritrea